-Sorbose 1-dehydrogenase (SDH) is an enzyme with systematic name -sorbose:acceptor 1-oxidoreductase. This enzyme catalyses the following chemical reaction

 -sorbose + acceptor  1-dehydro-L-sorbose + reduced acceptor

The product, -sorbosone, is an intermediate in bacterial 2-keto-L-gulonic-acid formation. Co2+ stimulate activity of this membrane-bound enzyme, while Cu2+ act as an inhibitor.

References

External links 
 

EC 1.1.99